Marcus Wilson (born 19 April 2002) is a Guyanese professional footballer who plays as a defender and midfielder for GFF Elite League club Santos and the Guyana national team.

Early life 
Marcus began playing football at the age of four with his father Andrew. He attended St. Pius Primary School before going to Chase Academy, where he completed CXC exams.

Club career 
Wilson began his career at Eastveldt FC before joining Georgetown. He would later join Santos.

International career 
Wilson has been the captain of Guyana at under-15 and under-17 level. He has also represented his nation at under-20 level. He received his first call-up for the senior national team of Guyana in May 2021. He made his debut in a 2–0 loss to Puerto Rico in FIFA World Cup qualification on 8 June 2021.

References

External links 

 
 

2002 births
Living people
Guyanese footballers
Association football defenders
Association football midfielders
Georgetown FC players
Santos FC (Guyana) players
GFF Elite League players
Guyana youth international footballers
Guyana under-20 international footballers
Guyana international footballers